Wolfgang Roth is the name of:

Wolfgang Roth (politician), German politician
Wolfgang Roth (scholar), German scholar and pastor